The following railroads currently or formerly operated in the U.S. state of New York.

Common freight carriers
Albany Port Railroad (APD) (Port of Albany)
Arcade and Attica Railroad (ARA)
B&H Rail Corporation (BH) (Owned by Livonia, Avon and Lakeville Railroad)
Batten Kill Railroad (BKRR)
Buffalo and Pittsburgh Railroad (BPRR) (Genesee and Wyoming)
Buffalo Southern Railroad (BSOR)
Canadian National Railway (CN)
Canadian Pacific Railway (CP) including subsidiary Delaware and Hudson Railway (DH)
Central New York Railroad (CNYK) (Operated by New York, Susquehanna and Western Railway)
Clarendon and Pittsford Railroad (CLP) (Owned by Vermont Railway)
Conrail Shared Assets Operations (CSAO) operates Staten Island Railroad (SIRR) (Jointly Owned by CSX Transportation and Norfolk Southern Railway)
CSX Transportation (CSXT)
Depew, Lancaster and Western Railroad (DLWR) (Genesee Valley Transportation)
Falls Road Railroad (FRR) (Genesee Valley Transportation)
Finger Lakes Railway (FGLK)
Frontier Rail (FRRX)
Housatonic Railroad (HRRC)
Ithaca Central Railroad (ITHR) (Watco Companies)
Livonia, Avon and Lakeville Railroad (LAL)
Lowville and Beaver River Railroad (LBR) (Out of Service)
Massena Terminal Railroad (MSTR) (Genesee and Wyoming Railroad)
Middletown and New Jersey Railroad (MNJ) (Regional Rail)
Mohawk, Adirondack and Northern Railroad (MHWA) (Genesee Valley Transportation)
New York and Atlantic Railway (NYA) (Anacostia Rail Holdings)
New York and Lake Erie Railroad (NYLE)
New York New Jersey Rail, LLC (NYNJ)
New York and Ogdensburg Railway (NYOG) (Owned by Vermont Railway)
New York, Susquehanna and Western Railway (NYSW)
Norfolk Southern Railway (NS)
Ontario Central Railroad (ONCT) (Operated by Finger Lakes Railway)
Ontario Midland Railroad (OMID)
Owego and Harford Railway (OHRY)
Providence and Worcester Railroad (PW) (Genesee and Wyoming)
Rochester and Southern Railroad (RSR) (Genesee and Wyoming)
Saratoga and North Creek Railway (SNC) (Out of Service)
SMS Rail Lines of New York (SNY) (Owned by SMS Rail Lines)
Somerset Railroad (SOM) (Operated by CSX Transportation)
South Buffalo Railway (SB)
Pan Am Railways (PAR)
Pan Am Southern (PAS) (Operated by Pan Am Railways)
Vermont Railway (VTR)
Wellsboro and Corning Railroad (WCOR) (Genesee and Wyoming)
Western New York and Pennsylvania Railroad (WNYP) (Owned by Livonia, Avon and Lakeville Railroad)

Private carriers
Kodak Park Railroad (Operated by Rochester Switching Services)
Global Container Terminals New York
South Brooklyn Railway (SBK)

Passenger carriers

Amtrak (AMTK) (high-speed rail, intercity rail, and long-distance rail)

Commuter rail
Long Island Rail Road (LI) (commuter rail)
Metro-North Railroad (MNCW) (commuter rail)
New Jersey Transit Rail Operations (NJTR) (commuter rail)

Rapid transit
AirTrain JFK (people mover)
Buffalo Metro Rail (light rail metro)
New York City Subway (rapid transit/heavy rail)
Port Authority Trans-Hudson (PATH) (rapid transit/heavy rail)
Staten Island Railway (SIR) (heavy rail/commuter rail/rapid transit)

Heritage railroad
Adirondack Scenic Railroad (ADIX) (tourist railway/ heritage railroad)
Arcade and Attica Railroad (ARA) (seasonally runs tourist trains; mostly a freight carrier)
Catskill Mountain Railroad (CMRR) (heritage railroad)
Cooperstown and Charlotte Valley Railroad (CACV) (heritage railroad)
Delaware and Ulster Railroad (DURR) (heritage railroad)
Medina Railroad Museum (heritage railroad)
New York Museum of Transportation (heritage railroad)
New York Transit Museum (operates historical trains throughout the New York City Subway System)
Rochester & Genesee Valley Railroad Museum (RGVM) (operating railroad museum)
Saratoga and North Creek Railroad (tourist railway/ heritage railroad)
Tioga Central Railroad (heritage railroad)
Trolley Museum of New York (heritage light rail)
Upper Hudson River Railroad (heritage railroad)

Defunct railroads

Street and electric railways

Adirondack Lakes' Traction Company
Albany and Hudson Railroad
Albany and Hudson Railway and Power Company
Albany Southern Railroad
Amsterdam Street Railroad
Atlantic Avenue Railroad
Auburn and Northern Electric Railroad
Auburn and Syracuse Electric Railroad
Babylon Railroad
Ballston Terminal Railroad
Batavia Traction Company
Belt Line Railway
Bennington and North Adams Street Railway
Berkshire Street Railway
Binghamton Railway
Black River Traction Company
Bleecker Street and Fulton Ferry Railroad
Bridge Operating Company
Broadway Railroad
Broadway Railway
Broadway Ferry and Metropolitan Avenue Railroad
Broadway and Seventh Avenue Railroad
Bronx Traction Company
Brooklyn Central Railroad
Brooklyn Central and Jamaica Railroad
Brooklyn City Railroad
Brooklyn City and Newtown Railroad
Brooklyn Crosstown Railroad
Brooklyn Elevated Railroad
Brooklyn Elevated Railway
Brooklyn Elevated Silent Safety Railway
Brooklyn Heights Railroad
Brooklyn and Jamaica Railway
Brooklyn–Manhattan Transit Corporation
Brooklyn and North River Railroad
Brooklyn, Queens County and Suburban Railroad
Brooklyn Rapid Transit Company
Brooklyn Union Elevated Railroad
Buffalo City Railway
Buffalo and Depew Railway
Buffalo and Erie Railway
Buffalo and Lake Erie Traction Company
Buffalo, Lockport and Rochester Railway
Buffalo Southern Railway
Buffalo and Williamsville Electric Railway
Bush Terminal Railroad
Bushwick Railroad
Calvary Cemetery, Greenpoint and Brooklyn Railroad
Canarsie Railroad
Catskill Electric Railway
Cayadutta Electric Railroad
Cedarhurst Railway
Central City Rail Way
Central Crosstown Railroad
Central Park, North and East River Railroad
Chautauqua Traction Company
Christopher and Tenth Street Railroad
City Island Railroad
Cohoes Railway
Coney Island and Brooklyn Railroad
Coney Island Elevated Railway
Coney Island, Fort Hamilton and Brooklyn Railroad
Coney Island and Gravesend Railway
Corning and Painted Post Street Railway
Cortland County Traction Company
Crosstown Street Railway of Buffalo
DeKalb Avenue and North Beach Railroad
DeKalb Avenue and North Brooklyn Railroad
Dry Dock, East Broadway and Battery Railroad
East River and Atlantic Ocean Railroad
Eastern New York Railroad
Echo Line Railroad
Eighth Avenue Railroad
Electric City Railway
Elmira, Corning and Waverly Railway
Elmira and Seneca Lake Traction Company
Elmira Water, Light and Railroad Company
Empire State Railroad
Far Rockaway Railroad
Fishkill Electric Railway
Flushing and College Point Electric Railway
Fonda, Johnstown and Gloversville Railroad
Fort George and Eleventh Avenue Railroad
Fort George Extension Railway
Forty-second Street and Grand Street Ferry Railroad
Forty-second Street, Manhattanville and St. Nicholas Avenue Railway
Freeport Railroad
Fulton Street Railroad
Geneva, Seneca Falls and Auburn Railroad
Geneva, Waterloo, Seneca Falls and Cayuga Lake Traction Company
Gilbert Elevated Railway
Glen Cove Railroad
Gloversville Street Electric Railroad
Grand Street and Newtown Railroad
Great South Bay Ferry Company
Greenbush and Nassau Electric Railway
Greenpoint and Lorimer Street Railroad
Greenwood and Coney Island Railroad
Harlem Bridge, Morrisania and Fordham Railway
Hornell Traction Company
Hornellsville and Canisteo Railway
Hornellsville Electric Railway
Houston, West Street and Pavonia Ferry Railroad
Hudson Light and Power and Railroad Company
Hudson and Manhattan Railroad
Hudson River and Eastern Traction Company
Hudson Street Railway
Hudson Tunnel Railway
Hudson Valley Railway
Huntington Railroad
Independent City Owned Rapid Transit Railroad
Interborough Rapid Transit Company
International Railway
Ithaca Street Railway
Ithaca Traction Corporation
Jamaica and Brooklyn Railroad
Jamaica and Brooklyn Road Company
Jamaica Central Railways
Jamestown Street Railway
Jamestown, Westfield and Northwestern Railroad
Jerome Park Railway
Johnstown, Gloversville and Kingsboro Horse Railroad
Kaydeross Railroad
Keeseville, Ausable Chasm and Lake Champlain Railroad
Kings County Electric Railway
Kings County Elevated Railway
Kingsbridge Railway
Kingston Consolidated Railroad
Long Beach Marine Railway
Long Island City and Newtown Railroad
Long Island Electric Railway
Long Island Traction Company
Manhattan Railway Company
Manhattan Bridge Three Cent Line
Manhattan and Queens Traction Company
Manhattan and Queens Traction Corporation
Marine Railway
Melrose and West Morrisania Railroad
Metropolitan Crosstown Railway
Metropolitan Elevated Railway
Metropolitan Street Railway
Mid-Crosstown Railway
Mineola, Hempstead and Freeport Traction Company
Mineola, Roslyn and Port Washington Traction Company
Mount Beacon-on-Hudson Association
Mount Vernon and Eastchester Railway
Nassau Railroad
Nassau County Railway
Nassau Electric Railroad
New Paltz, Highland and Poughkeepsie Traction Company
New Rochelle Railway and Transit Company
New Williamsburgh and Flatbush Railroad
New York Railways
New York, Auburn and Lansing Railroad
New York City Railway
New York City Interborough Railway
New York and Coney Island Railroad
New York Consolidated Railroad
New York Elevated Railroad
New York, Fordham and Bronx Railway
New York and Harlem Railroad
New York and Jersey Railroad
New York and Long Island Traction Company
New York Municipal Railway
New York and North Shore Railway
New York and North Shore Traction Company
New York and Queens County Railway
New York and Stamford Railway
New York State Railways
New York, Westchester and Connecticut Traction Company
Newark and Marion Railway
Newtown Railway
Niagara Gorge Railroad
Niagara Junction Railway
Ninth Avenue Railroad
North and East River Railway
North End Street Railway
North Third Avenue and Fleetwood Park Railroad
Northport Traction Company
Ocean Electric Railway
Ogdensburg Street Railway
One Hundred and Forty-fifth Street Crosstown Railroad
Oneida Railway
Oneonta and Mohawk Valley Railroad
Orange County Traction Company
Park Avenue Railroad
Paul Smith's Electric Light and Power and Railroad Company
Peekskill Lighting and Railroad Company
Pelham Park Railroad
Pelham Park and City Island Railway
Penn Yan, Keuka Park and Branchport Railway
Penn Yan and Lake Shore Railway
Plattsburgh Traction Company
Port Jervis Electric Light, Power, Gas and Railroad Company
Port Jervis Traction Company
Poughkeepsie City and Wappingers Falls Electric Railway
Poughkeepsie and Wappingers Falls Railway
Prospect Park and Coney Island Railroad
Prospect Park and South Brooklyn Railroad
Putnam and Westchester Traction Company
Queens Railway
Queensboro Bridge Railway Company
Richmond County Railroad
Richmond Light and Railroad Company
Richmond Street Railway
Rochester Railway Company
Rochester and Eastern Rapid Railway
Rochester, Lockport and Buffalo Railroad
Rochester and Manitou Railroad
Rochester and Sodus Bay Railway
Rochester and Suburban Railway
Rochester Subway (RSB)
Rochester and Syracuse Railroad
Rochester, Syracuse and Eastern Railroad
Rockaway Village Railroad
St. Lawrence International Electric Railroad and Land Company
Schenectady Railway
Sea Beach Railway
Sea View Railroad
Seashore Municipal Railroad
Second Avenue Railroad
Sixth Avenue Railroad
Soundview Transportation Company
South Brooklyn Street Railroad
South Ferry Railroad
South Shore Traction Company
Southern Boulevard Railroad
Southern New York Railway
Southern New York Power and Railway Corporation
Southfield Beach Railroad
Staten Island Electric Railroad
Staten Island Horse Railroad
Staten Island Midland Railroad
Staten Island Midland Railway
Staten Island Traction Company
Suburban Rapid Transit Company
Suburban Traction Company
Suffolk Traction Company
Syracuse, Lake Shore and Northern Railroad
Syracuse Northern Electric Railway
Syracuse Rapid Transit Railway
Syracuse and South Bay Electric Railroad
Syracuse and Suburban Railroad
Tarrytown, White Plains and Mamaroneck Railway
Third Avenue Railroad
Third Avenue Railway
Third Avenue Bridge Company
Thirty-fourth Street Railroad
Thirty-fourth Street Crosstown Railway
Thirty-fourth Street Ferry and Eleventh Avenue Railroad
Troy and New England Railway
Twenty-eighth and Thirtieth Streets Crosstown Railroad
Twenty-eighth and Twenty-ninth Streets Crosstown Railroad
Twenty-third Street Railway
Union Railroad
Union Railway of New York City
United Railroad
United Traction Company
Utica Belt Line Street Railroad
Utica and Mohawk Valley Railway
Van Brunt Street and Erie Basin Railroad
Van Nest, West Farms and Westchester Traction Company
Wakefield and Westchester Traction Company
Wallkill Transit Company
Warren and Jamestown Street Railway
Washington Street and State Asylum Railroad
Waverly, Sayre and Athens Traction Company
West Farms and Westchester Traction Company
West Side and Yonkers Patent Railway
Westchester Electric Railroad
Westchester Street Railroad
Western New York and Pennsylvania Traction Company
Williamsbridge and Westchester Traction Company
Yonkers Railroad

Other passenger carriers
Niagara and Western New York Railroad
OnTrack
Prospect Park Incline Railway

Private carriers
Crown Point Iron Company's Railroad
Fulton Chain Railroad
Marion River Carry Railroad
Peekskill Iron Company

Not completed
Dunderberg Spiral Railway
New England and Oswego Railroad
New York and Boston Rapid Transit Company
Ogdensburg, Clayton and Rome Railroad
Portland, Rutland, Oswego and Chicago Railroad

Notes

External links
New York State railbeds

 
 
New York
Railroads
Railroads